Tina Tyus-Shaw (born in Griffin, Georgia) has been a television news anchor and journalist at WSAV-TV in Savannah, Georgia for more than 30 years.

Tina wanted to be a television broadcaster at an early age, and graduated from Tennessee State University with a Bachelor of Science degree in Speech, Communication and Theater.

She worked a series of radio and television jobs in Macon, Georgia; North Carolina; and Columbus, Georgia, before settling in Savannah in 1992. She started working for WSAV-TV in April of that year as a weekend news anchor but within just three years had made it to the main anchor position on the nightly news at 6 and 11.

In 1996 she was chosen to carry the Olympic Torch through Savannah. This continued an Olympic tradition in Tina's family. Her aunt Wyomia Tyus was a three-time gold medalist in 1964 and 1968.

She is best known to viewers as a champion for breast cancer survivors. Her popular Buddy Check 3 reminds women and men to do regular breast self exams each month.

Tina is married and has four children.

She contributed to the 2016 book Shift Happens: Inspirational Stories on Finding Happiness, Achieving Success and Overcoming Obstacles about her experienced with miscarriage.

References

External links
  WSAV.com Bio

Living people
American television journalists
American women television journalists
Tennessee State University alumni
Year of birth missing (living people)
21st-century American women
African-American television personalities
African-American television hosts
African-American women journalists